Kashti may refer to:

Places
 Kashti, Nashik, a village in Nashik District, Maharashtra, India
 Kasti, Maharashtra (Kashti), a village in Ahmadnagar District, Maharashtra, India
 Kasti, Rajasthan (Kashti), a village in Jodhpur District, Rajasthan, India
 Keshtu (Kashti), a village in Shonbeh and Tasuj District, Dashti County, Bushehr Province, Iran

Media
 Kashti (TV series), Indian television series
 Kashti (1954 film), List of Bollywood films of 1954

See also
 Kasti (disambiguation)